The 1994–95 Cypriot Fourth Division was the 10th season of the Cypriot fourth-level football league. AEK Kakopetrias won their 2nd title. The first 5 teams were promoted to the 1995–96 Cypriot Third Division.

See also
 Cypriot Fourth Division
 1994–95 Cypriot First Division
 1994–95 Cypriot Cup

Cypriot Fourth Division seasons
Cyprus
1994–95 in Cypriot football